In Christian tradition, the Four Evangelists are Matthew, Mark, Luke, and John, the authors attributed with the creation of the four canonical Gospel accounts. In the New Testament, they bear the following titles: the Gospel of Matthew; the Gospel of Mark; the Gospel of Luke; and the Gospel of John. These names were assigned to the works by the early church fathers in the 2nd century AD; none of the writers signed their work.

Gospels

The gospels of Matthew, Mark, and Luke are known as the Synoptic Gospels, because they include many of the same stories, often in the same sequence.  While the periods to which the gospels are usually dated suggest otherwise, convention traditionally holds that the authors were two of the Twelve Apostles of Jesus, John and Matthew, as well as two "apostolic men," Mark and Luke, whom Orthodox Tradition records as members of the 70 Apostles (Luke 10):
Matthew – a former tax collector (Levi) who was called by Jesus to be one of the Twelve Apostles,
Mark – a follower of Peter and so an "apostolic man,"
Luke – a doctor who wrote what is now the book of Luke to Theophilus. Also known to have written the book of Acts (or Acts of the Apostles) and to have been a close friend of Paul of Tarsus,
John – a disciple of Jesus and the youngest of his Twelve Apostles.

They are called evangelists, a word meaning "people who proclaim good news," because their books aim to tell the "good news" ("gospel") of Jesus.

Symbols
In iconography, the evangelists often appear in Evangelist portraits derived from classical tradition, and are also frequently represented by the symbols which originate from the four "living creatures" that draw the throne-chariot of God, the Merkabah, in the vision in the Book of Ezekiel (Chapter 1) reflected in the Book of Revelation (ff), referred to as the four 'Seraphims', though neither source links the creatures to the Evangelists (of course the depiction of the Seraphims predates in chronology the writing of the new testaments books which portrays the writers John, Luke, Mark, Matthew as symbolically emodied by the four Seraphims ). Images normally, but not invariably, appear with wings like angels. When the symbols of the Four Evangelists appear together, it is called a Tetramorph, and is common in the Romanesque art of Europe, in church frescoes or mural paintings, for instance.

The meanings accruing to the symbols grew over centuries, with an early formulation by Jerome, and were fully expressed by Rabanus Maurus, who set out three layers of meaning for the beasts, as representing firstly the Evangelists, secondly the nature of Christ, and thirdly the virtues required of a Christian for salvation: These animals may have originally been seen as representing the highest forms of the various types of animals, i.e., man, the king of creation as the image of the creator; the lion as the king of beasts of prey (meat-eating); the ox as the king of domesticated animals (grass-eating) and the eagle as the king of the birds.

 Matthew the Evangelist, the author of the first gospel account, is symbolized by a winged man, or angel. Matthew's gospel starts with Joseph's genealogy from Abraham; it represents Jesus' Incarnation, and so Christ's human nature. This signifies that Christians should use their reason for salvation.
Mark the Evangelist, the author of the second gospel account, is symbolized by a winged lion – a figure of courage and monarchy. The lion also represents Jesus' resurrection (because lions were believed to sleep with open eyes, a comparison with Christ in the tomb), and Christ as king. This signifies that Christians should be courageous on the path of salvation.
Luke the Evangelist, the author of the third gospel account (and the Acts of the Apostles), is symbolized by a winged ox or bull – a figure of sacrifice, service, and strength. Luke's account begins with the duties of Zechariah in the temple; it represents Jesus's sacrifice in His Passion and Crucifixion, as well as Christ being High priest (this also represents Mary's obedience). The ox signifies that Christians should be prepared to sacrifice themselves in following Christ.
 John the Evangelist, the author of the fourth gospel account, is symbolized by an eagle – a figure of the sky, and believed by Christian scholars to be able to look straight into the sun. John starts with an eternal overview of Jesus the Logos and goes on to describe many things with a "higher" christology than the other three (synoptic) gospels; it represents Jesus's Ascension and Christ's divine nature. This symbolizes that Christians should look on eternity without flinching as they journey towards their goal of union with God.

Each of the symbols is depicted with wings, following the biblical sources first in Ezekiel 1–2, and in Revelation. The symbols are shown with, or in place of, the Evangelists in early medieval Gospel Books, and are the usual accompaniment to Christ in Majesty when portrayed during the same period, reflecting the vision in Revelation. They were presented as one of the most common motifs found on church portals and apses, as well as many other locations.

When surrounding Christ, the figure of the man usually appears at top left – above Christ's right hand, with the lion above Christ's left arm. Underneath the man is the ox and underneath the lion is the eagle. This both reflects the medieval idea of the order of "nobility" of nature of the beasts (man, lion, ox, eagle) and the text of Ezekiel 1:10. From the thirteenth century, their use began to decline, as a new conception of Christ in Majesty, showing the wounds of the Passion, came into use. Sometimes, in Evangelist, portraits they appear to dictate to the writing evangelist.

Naming
Matthew is often cited as the "first Gospel account," not only owing to its place in the canon, but also in view of the patristic witness to this effect. Most biblical scholars however, see the gospel account of Mark as having been written first (see Markan priority) and John's gospel account as having been written last.

It has become customary to speak of "the Gospel of Matthew" ... "the Gospel of John", not least because of its shorter length; but it is worth noting that the ancient titles do not use the genitive of possession, but the preposition "according to", signifying that each evangelist sets forth the one "Gospel of God" according to his own capacity, but not in the sense of creating his own story.

Depictions

See also

Gospel harmony
Authorship of the Johannine works
Tetramorph
Gospel
Four Gospels

References

External links

 The Four Evangelists in Stained Glass
Catholic Encyclopedia: Evangelist
PBS Frontline: The Story of the Storytellers
 The Four Evangelists at the Christian Iconography web site

 
Quartets
Canonical Gospels
Christian iconography
Christian terminology

Groups of Christian saints
Groups of Roman Catholic saints
Groups of Eastern Orthodox saints